Alexander Martin (1740–1807) was the Federalist governor of the state of North Carolina, now one of the US.

Alexander Martin may also refer to:
 Alexander Martin (Canadian politician) (1842–1921)
 Alexander Martin (British sport shooter) (1895–1962), British Olympic sport shooter
 Alexander Martin (Canadian sport shooter) (1864–1951), Canadian Olympic sport shooter
 Alexander E. Martin (1867–?), American politician
 Alexander Munro Martin (1852–1915), Canadian politician
 Alexander Martin (Scottish minister) (1856–193?), Scottish Presbyterian minister
 Sandy Martin (politician) (born 1957), British politician

See also